Miguel Rodrigues may refer to:

 Miguel Rodrigues (footballer, born 1993), Portuguese footballer
 Miguel Tavares Rodrigues (born 1993), Portuguese volleyball player
 Miguel Rodrigues (footballer, born 1996), Swiss footballer